Albert T. Corbett is an associate research professor emeritus of human–computer interaction at Carnegie Mellon University. He is widely known for his role in the development of the Cognitive Tutor software, leading to one article with over 1,000 citations. Along with John Robert Anderson, he developed the Bayesian Knowledge Tracing algorithm, which is used in Cognitive Tutor software. This work has been particularly influential in the educational data mining community—over half of the EDM conference papers published in 2011 and 2012 cited Bayesian Knowledge-Tracing.
Corbett studied psychology at Brown University, and obtained a doctorate in psychology from the University of Oregon. His doctoral advisor was Wayne Wickelgren.

See also 
Cognitive Tutor
Learning sciences
ACT-R
John Robert Anderson (psychologist)
Kenneth Koedinger

Current Papers 
Corbett, A.T. and Anderson, J.R. (2001). Locus of feedback control in computer-based tutoring: Impact on learning rate, achievement and attitudes. Proceedings of ACM CHI'2001 Conference on Human Factors in Computing Systems, 245–252.
Corbett, A.T., McLaughlin, M.S., Scarpinatto, K.C. and Hadley, W.S. (2000). Analyzing and Generating Mathematical Models: An Algebra II Cognitive Tutor Design Study. Intelligent tutoring systems: Proceedings of the Fifth international conference, ITS'2000, 314–323.
Corbett, A.T. and Trask, H. (2000). Instructional interventions in computer-based tutoring: Differential impact on learning time and accuracy. Proceedings of ACM CHI'2000 Conference on Human Factors in Computing Systems, 97–104.
Baker R.S., Corbett A.T., Koedinger K.R. (2002) The Resilience of Overgeneralization of Knowledge about Data Representations. Presented at American Educational Research Association Conference
Baker R.S., Corbett A.T., Koedinger K.R. (2001) Toward a Model of Learning Data Representations. Proceedings of the Cognitive Science Society Conference, 45–50.
Mathan, S., Koedinger, K.R., Corbett, A., & Hyndman, A. (2000). Effective strategies for bridging gulfs between users and computer systems. In Proceedings of HCI-Aero 2000: International Conference on Human Computer Interaction in Aeronautics. (pp. 197–202). Toulouse, France.
Corbett, A.T., McLaughlin, M.S. and Scarpinatto, K.C. (2000). Modeling student knowledge: Cognitive tutors in high school and college. User modeling and user-adapted interaction, 10, 81–108.

References 

American cognitive scientists
American educational psychologists
Living people
Carnegie Mellon University faculty
Human-Computer Interaction Institute faculty
University of Oregon alumni
Year of birth missing (living people)
Brown University alumni